{{DISPLAYTITLE:C5H12N2}}
The molecular formula C5H12N2 (molar mass: 100.16 g/mol) may refer to:

 1,4-Diazacycloheptane, a colorless, oily cyclic diamine
 Methylpiperazine, a heterocyclic organic compound